Two-stage presidential elections were held in Finland in 1950, the first time the public had been involved in a presidential election since 1937 as three non-popular elections had taken place in 1940, 1943 and 1946. On 16 and 17 January the public elected presidential electors to an electoral college. They in turn elected the President. The result was a victory for Juho Kusti Paasikivi, who won on the first ballot. The turnout for the popular vote was 63.8%.
President Paasikivi was at first reluctant to seek re-election, at least in regular presidential elections.  He considered asking the Finnish Parliament to re-elect him through another emergency law.
Former President Ståhlberg, who acted as his informal advisor, persuaded him to seek re-election through normal means when he bluntly told Paasikivi:  "If the Finnish people would not bother to elect a President every six years, they truly would not deserve an independent and democratic republic."  Paasikivi conducted a passive, "front-porch" style campaign, making few speeches.  By contrast, the Agrarian presidential candidate, Urho Kekkonen, spoke in about 130 election meetings.  The Communists claimed that Paasikivi had made mistakes in his foreign policy and had not truly pursued a peaceful and friendly foreign policy towards the Soviet Union.  The Agrarians criticized Paasikivi more subtly and indirectly, referring to his advanced age (79 years), and speaking anecdotally about aged masters of farmhouses, who had not realized in time that they should have surrendered their houses' leadership to their sons.  Kekkonen claimed that the incumbent Social Democratic minority government of Prime Minister K.A. Fagerholm had neglected the Finnish farmers and the unemployed.  Kekkonen also championed a non-partisan democracy that would be neither a social democracy nor a people's democracy.  The Communists hoped that their presidential candidate, former Prime Minister Mauno Pekkala, would draw votes away from the Social Democrats (who quietly supported Paasikivi), because Pekkala was a former Social Democrat.  The Agrarians lost over four per cent of their share of the vote compared to the 1948 parliamentary elections.  This loss ensured Paasikivi's re-election.  Otherwise Kekkonen could have been narrowly elected President - provided that all the Communist and People's Democratic presidential electors would also have voted for him.

Results

Popular vote

Electoral college

References

Presidential elections in Finland
Finland
Presidential
Finland